Robert Lagace (born November 28, 1969) is a Canadian former ice sledge hockey player. He won medals with Team Canada at the 1994 Winter Paralympics and 1998 Winter Paralympics as well Gold at the 2000 World Championships held in Salt Lake City, Utah assisting on the Gold Medal-winning goal in overtime against Norway. He also played in the 2002 Winter Paralympics where the team finished in 4th place.

References

1969 births
Living people
Paralympic bronze medalists for Canada
Paralympic silver medalists for Canada
Paralympic sledge hockey players of Canada
Canadian sledge hockey players
Ice hockey people from Toronto
Medalists at the 1994 Winter Paralympics
Medalists at the 1998 Winter Paralympics
Paralympic medalists in sledge hockey
Ice sledge hockey players at the 1994 Winter Paralympics
Ice sledge hockey players at the 1998 Winter Paralympics